Melody Hits was a Canadian exempt Category B Arabic language specialty channel owned by Ethnic Channels Group. It broadcast programming from Melody Hits in addition to local Canadian content.

Background

The Canadian version of the channel originally launched as Melody Arabia but was subsequently re-branded as Melody Hits in November 2011.

Melody Hits was a top rated music channel from Egypt featuring all the latest hits from the Arab world and international artists. It aired non-stop video clips as well as fashion and lifestyle programming. It also featured an interactive component that allowed viewers to request their favorite music videos.

The Melody TV network was owned by Gamal Marwan, son of Ashraf Marwan. The network ceased to exist by 2013 due to financial difficulties.

References

External links
 Ethnic Channels Group page

Arab-Canadian culture
Arabic-language television stations
Digital cable television networks in Canada
Multicultural and ethnic television in Canada
Television channels and stations established in 2011
Television channels and stations disestablished in 2013